Zheng Jian (born 22 October 1963) is a Chinese former swimmer who competed in the 1984 Summer Olympics and in the 1988 Summer Olympics.

References

1963 births
Living people
Chinese male butterfly swimmers
Olympic swimmers of China
Swimmers at the 1984 Summer Olympics
Swimmers at the 1988 Summer Olympics
Asian Games medalists in swimming
Swimmers at the 1986 Asian Games
Asian Games silver medalists for China
Medalists at the 1986 Asian Games
20th-century Chinese people